Juda Charles Bennett is an author, a literary theorist and professor of English at The College of New Jersey. He received his B.A. in English and creative writing from Binghamton University in 1988; his M.A. in English and American Literature from Washington University in St. Louis in 1989; and his Ph.D. in English and American Literature from Washington University in 1994.

Bennett is the author of Toni Morrison and the Queer Pleasure of Ghosts (2014), Essays Unzipped (2007), and The Passing Figure: Racial Confusion in Modern American Literature (1996). He is also the author of a number of literary essays on race and sexuality.

External links
 TCNJ English Faculty Directory

Washington University in St. Louis alumni
Binghamton University alumni
American academics of English literature
Living people
Year of birth missing (living people)